Jonah Scott is an American voice actor working for Funimation, SDI Media and Bang Zoom! Entertainment. He is known for his roles in Beastars as Legoshi, Akudama Drive as Courier, High-Rise Invasion as Sniper Mask and Dying Light 2 Stay Human as Aiden Caldwell.

Filmography

Anime

Films

Web

Video games

Awards

|-
| 2021
| Legoshi in Beastars
| Best VA Performance (EN)
| Crunchyroll Anime Awards
| 
|
|

References

External links
 

Living people
American male video game actors
American male voice actors
Twitch (service) streamers
21st-century American male actors
Year of birth missing (living people)
Bisexual male actors
Bisexual men
VTubers